Elliot (also spelled Elliott, Eliot, Eliott, or Elyot) is a surname and a masculine given name.

Elliot and variants may also refer to:

Places
Australia
 Elliott, Northern Territory
 Elliott, Tasmania, a locality

Canada
 Elliot Lake, a city in Ontario
 Claud Elliott Lake Provincial Park, British Columbia
 Claud Elliott Creek Ecological Reserve

South Africa
 Elliot, Eastern Cape, a town in the Eastern Cape

United Kingdom
 Elliot, Angus, a hamlet in Angus, Scotland
 Eliot College, Kent, a college of the University of Kent, named after T. S. Eliot
 Elliott Hudson College, a sixth form centre in Leeds, Yorkshire, England
 Elliott School, Putney, a comprehensive school in Putney, South London

United States
 Eliot, Maine
 Eliot House, residential house at Harvard College, named for Charles William Eliot
 Elliott, California, former settlement in San Joaquin County
 Elliot Park, Minneapolis, Minnesota
 Elliott, Illinois
 Elliott, Indiana
 Elliott, Iowa
 Elliott County, Kentucky
 Elliott, Missouri
 Elliott, North Dakota
 Eliot, Portland, Oregon
 Elliott (Pittsburgh), Pennsylvania
 Elliott, West Virginia
 Elliott Bay, Seattle, Washington

Buildings and structures
 Eliot (MBTA station) on the Green Line D branch in Boston
 Elliot Tower, a proposed residential skyscraper in New Zealand

Companies, groups, and organizations
 Elliott Brothers (computer company)
 Elliott Company
 Elliott Management Corporation
 Elliott (band), an emo band from Louisville, Kentucky

Vehicles
 USS Elliot, several ships of the United States Navy
 Elliott 6m, an Olympic sailing class boat

Other uses
 Elliot Pecan, an American pecan variety
 Elliott wave principle, a form of stock market technical analysis
 Winter Storm Elliott (2022)
 Justice Elliott (disambiguation)
 Elliott, a nickname given to an Austrosaurus sauropod dinosaur fossil discovered in Queensland, Australia

See also